was a Japanese daimyō of the early Edo period. He served in a variety of positions in the Tokugawa shogunate, including rōjū and Kyoto Shoshidai.

References
 Bolitho, Harold. (1974). Treasures Among Men: The Fudai Daimyo in Tokugawa Japan. New Haven: Yale University Press.  ;  OCLC 185685588

|-

|-

|-

|-

1632 births
1699 deaths
Daimyo
Kyoto Shoshidai
Rōjū